The Angry Silence is a 1960 black-and-white British drama film directed by Guy Green and starring Richard Attenborough, Pier Angeli, Michael Craig and Bernard Lee. The film marked the first release through screenwriter Bryan Forbes's production venture, Beaver Films, and Forbes won a BAFTA Award and an Oscar nomination for his contribution (shared with original story writers Michael Craig and Richard Gregson).

Plot
Factory worker Tom Curtis has two children and his wife, Anna, is pregnant, putting him under financial pressure. Consequently, he refuses to take part in an unofficial strike, meaning a loss of wages, which he is entitled to do. The strike is planned by outside activist Travers and orchestrated by shop steward Bert Connolly, who concocts spurious demands as part of his campaign to pressure the management into agreeing to a closed shop, giving the union greater influence.

Those who continue to work find that their properties are subject to repeated attacks, including bricks through windows and arson, and join the strike out of fear. Curtis alone continues to work in a show of defiance against threats and intimidation.

When the strike ends, Curtis is accused of being a scab and sent to Coventry. Then, when anti-union newspapers interview him and report on his plight, Connolly demands his dismissal, backing his demand with a work to rule and overtime ban. Management fears that continued publicity will mean the loss of a major contract, while some workers take matters into their own hands.

Cast

 Richard Attenborough as Tom Curtis
 Pier Angeli as Anna Curtis
 Michael Craig as Joe Wallace
 Bernard Lee as Bert Connolly
 Alfred Burke as Travers
 Geoffrey Keen as Davis
 Stephen Lindo as Brian
 Laurence Naismith as Martindale
 Russell Napier as Thompson
 Penelope Horner as Pat
 Brian Bedford as Eddie
 Brian Murray as Gladys
 Norman Bird as Roberts
 Beckett Bould as Arkwright 
 Oliver Reed as Mick
 Edna Petrie as Harpy 
 Lloyd Pearson as Howarth
 Norman Shelley as Seagrave
 Daniel Farson as himself 
 Alan Whicker as himself
 Ronald Hines as Ball 
 Bernard Horsfall as Pryce-Evans
 Roger Maxwell as Collins
 George Murcell as Jones 
 Gerald Sim as Masters
 Marianne Stone as Mavis
 Frederick Peisley as Lewis

The film is also notable for the early appearance of several actors who later went on to become household names, such as Oliver Reed.

Production
Kenneth More was initially considered for the role of Tom Curtis.

Reception
The film received positive reviews in the UK and US. Variety wrote that Guy Green had directed with 'quiet skill, leaving the film to speak for itself'. The film was entered into the 10th Berlin International Film Festival.

By 1971 the film made an estimated profit of £58,000. In 1997 Bryan Forbes estimated the profit at £200,000.

After the film's release Richard Attenborough visited a working men's club in Aberdare, South Wales, that was refusing to show the film. Many such clubs had banned the film because of its anti-strike plot. However, after Attenborough explained his position on the film, the miners allowed it to be screened. This was important because, during the 1960s, films required such showings to drive ticket sales.

Some critics have raised doubts about the politics of the film, particularly with regard to trivialisation of the needs and demands of the workers. Others suggest that the film is also a reflection of British working-class values at the time, such as 'an Englishman's home is his castle'.

On Rotten Tomatoes the film has a rating of 80%, based on reviews from 5 critics.

References

External links
 
 
 
 
 
 Movie Location

1960 films
British drama films
1960 drama films
1960s English-language films
British black-and-white films
Films set in England
Films set in factories
Films directed by Guy Green
Films about the labor movement
Films produced by Richard Attenborough
Films scored by Malcolm Arnold
1960s British films